"The Anniversary Waltz" is the title of two medley singles released in 1990 by English rock band Status Quo. The medleys consist of hit songs from the 1950s, 1960s, and 1970s. One of the songs performed, Dion's "The Wanderer" had previously been covered by Status Quo in 1984. "The Anniversary Waltz" was divided into two parts for release as a single. Part One was the bigger hit, reaching number two on the UK Singles Chart.

Both parts of "The Anniversary Waltz" were recorded live in the studio. The sleeves for all formats feature the legend 'It's Live Sonny' which was included (together with a small sketch of a rabbit) in answer to critics who had likened the Anniversary Waltz to previous releases by Jive Bunny. The first batch contained two photos of Rick Parfitt instead of one of Parfitt and one of Jeff Rich. Due to a pressing error, some 12 inch copies included live versions of "Little Lady" and "Paper Plane"; these were intended to be B-sides of the cancelled release of the re-mixed version of "The Power of Rock".

Track listings

Part One
7-inch and cassette
 "The Anniversary Waltz (Part One)" (5:25) featuring:
 Let's Dance" (Lee)
 "Red River Rock" (Kind/Mack/Mendlesohn)
 "No Particular Place to Go" (Berry)
 "The Wanderer" (Maresca)
 "I Hear You Knocking" (Bartholomew/King)
 "Lucille" (Collins/Penniman)
 "Great Balls of Fire" (Hammer/Blackwell)
 "The Power of Rock" (Parfitt/Williams/Rossi) (4:37)

12-inch and CD
 "The Anniversary Waltz" (10:30) featuring:
 "Rock 'n' Roll Music" (Berry)
 "Lover Please" (Swan)
 "That'll Be the Day" (Allison/Holly/Petty)
 "Singing the Blues" (Endsley)
 "When Will I Be Loved" (P Everly)
 "Let's Work Together" (Harrison)
 "You Keep a-Knockin'" (Penniman)
 "Long Tall Sally" (Johnson/Blackwell/Penniman)
 "Let's Dance" (Lee), "Red River Rock" (Kind/Mack/Mendlesohn)
 "No Particular Place to Go" (Berry)
 "The Wanderer" (Maresca)
 "I Hear You Knocking" (Bartholomew/King)
 "Lucille" (Collins/Penniman)
 "Great Balls of Fire" (Hammer/Blackwell)
 "The Power of Rock" (Parfitt/Williams/Rossi) (4:37)
 "Perfect Remedy" (Rossi/Frost) (4:33)

Part Two
7-inch, cassette, and CD
 "The Anniversary Waltz (Part Two)" (5:22) featuring:
 "Rock 'n' Roll Music" (Berry)
 "Lover Please" (Swan)
 "That'll Be the Day" (Allison/Holly/Petty)
 "Singing the Blues" (Endsley)
 "When Will I Be Loved" (P Everly)
 "Let's Work Together" (Harrison)
 "You Keep a-Knockin'" (Penniman)
 "Long Tall Sally" (Johnson/Blackwell/Penniman)
 "Dirty Water" (Live N.E.C Birmingham, 17/18 December 1989) (Rossi/Young) (3:56)

Charts

Part One

Weekly charts

Year-end charts

Part Two

Certifications

Release history

References

Status Quo (band) songs
1990 singles
1990 songs
Phonogram Records singles
Song recordings produced by Pip Williams
Vertigo Records singles